TechChange is a US social enterprise which provides courses on the use of technology in addressing social and global challenges. Their e-learning platform "has been used by more than 600 students from more than 70 countries." It is a registered benefit corporation based in Washington, DC and was founded in the summer of 2010. The Economist dubbed TechChange as ”the Geeks for Good”.

Courses
TechChange provides online certificate courses on a number of topics including technology for emergency management, mobile phones for international development, social media for social change, social entrepreneurship, digital organizing, open government and more.

Activities
TechChange also partners with international development, humanitarian, and peacebuilding organizations such as USAID, US State Department, World Bank and United Nations Foundation to deliver online educational content. In 2012, TechChange partnered with the mHealth Alliance, a joint program hosted by the United Nations Foundation, to create the first online certificate course in mHealth.

TechChange produces educational animations for international development topics and tools. In April 2013, a TechChange animation on M-Pesa, the popular mobile money transfer program was featured as the United States Agency for International Development video of the week.

TechChange has been featured in a variety of publications for their new approaches to online learning and capacity building including the New York Times, PBS NewsHour, The Economist, Fast Company, Chronicle of Higher Education, Stanford Social Innovation Review, The Guardian, and Dowser.org.

References

External links

Education companies established in 2010
American companies established in 2010
American educational websites
Educational technology companies of the United States
Software companies based in Washington, D.C.
Virtual learning environments
Learning management systems
International development agencies
Social enterprises
Software companies of the United States